The North Carolina Tar Heels men's basketball team plays at the Division I level of the National Collegiate Athletics Association (NCAA) in the Atlantic Coast Conference (ACC). The Tar Heels originally did not play within any athletic conference, but joined the Southern Conference in 1921 when it was first established. After playing in the Southern Conference for 22 years, North Carolina left in 1953 to join the newly created ACC. The Tar Heels play their home games in the Dean E. Smith Center, named after the 15th head coach Dean Smith. They previously played in Carmichael Auditorium, Woollen Gymnasium, The Tin Can, and began their existence playing in Bynum Gymnasium, which is now home to the admissions office for the university's graduate school programs.

There have been 19 head coaches in the history of Carolina basketball and the team has played two seasons without one.  The program has played 3,151 games across 112 seasons from the program's inaugural 1910–11 season to the current year, 2021–22. Three Tar Heel coaches have led the team to an NCAA Men's Division I Basketball Championship: Frank McGuire in 1957; Smith in 1982 and 1993; and Roy Williams in 2005, 2009, and 2017.  Smith, in 1971, led North Carolina to its only National Invitation Tournament (NIT) championship. North Carolina also received a retroactive national championship for the 1923–24 team coached by Norman Shepard, which was given by the Helms Athletic Foundation. Eleven coaches have won the conference regular season by having the best overall regular season record with the Tar Heels: Norman Shepard, Monk McDonald, Harlan Sanborn, Bo Shepard, Bill Lange, Walter Skidmore, Ben Carnevale, McGuire, Smith, Matt Doherty, and Williams.  Eleven coaches have won the conference tournament with the Tar Heels:  Norman Shepard, McDonald, Sanborn, Bo Shepard, Lange, Skidmore, Carnevale, McGuire, Smith, Bill Guthridge, and Williams.

Smith had the longest tenure at North Carolina, coaching for 36 seasons, and is the all-time leader in games coached (1,133) and wins at the school (879). Smith's 879 wins were the most of any NCAA men's Division I coach at the time of his retirement in 1997. Smith was the head coach for United States Men's Basketball that won an Olympic Gold Medal in 1976 while also working as the head coach of North Carolina, a feat that no other North Carolina coach has replicated.  Several coaches both played for and coached basketball at North Carolina. Davis, McDonald, and Doherty played for and coached the men's varsity basketball team. McDonald and Doherty played on teams that were awarded national championships, McDonald on the 1923–24 team and Doherty on the 1981–82 team. Williams both played for and coached the North Carolina men's junior varsity team.Davis also had a stint as the JV head coach while on the bench under Williams. Brothers Norman and Bo Shepard are the only two head coaches to be related to each other. Norman Shepard is the all-time leader in winning percentage, having never lost a game. Statistically, Cartmell has been the least successful coach of the Tar Heels, with a winning percentage of .510. No coach has had an overall losing record at North Carolina. Six coaches have received coaching awards while the head coach of North Carolina: Carnevale, McGuire, Smith, Gutheridge, Doherty, and Williams.  Carnevale, McGuire, Smith, and Williams have all been inducted into the Basketball Hall of Fame. Roy Williams was hired in 2003, and retired following a school-record three national championships in 2021.

The current head coach is  Hubert Davis, who played under Smith from 1988–92 and served as an assistant to Williams for nine seasons prior to being elevated to the head coach position. Upon Davis' appointment as head coach he became the 19th coach in program history, and the first African-American to hold the position.

Statistics

Statistics are correct as of the 2022–23 college basketball season.

Notes

References
General

Specific

North Carolina

North Carolina Tar Heels basketball, men's, coaches